The Thai school uniform is compulsory for students in Thai public and private school systems, not including a higher education institute which provides degree level education. Few variations from the standard model are permitted, but schools are not restricted from adopting additional, non-standard uniforms.

Public schools

University 
University uniforms are generally standard throughout the country. They typically consist of a white blouse and plain or pleated skirt for females, and long black trousers, a white long-sleeved shirt with a dark blue or black tie for males. There are minor variations for Muslim or transgender students. Thai university dress codes have been the subject of both controversy and satire. Research has indicated that the wearing of uniforms reinforces in-group and out-group behaviours and existing hierarchies, but "does not promote students' life goals".

Controversy 
On 1 December 2020, Thai school students, who have been helping to lead the pro-democracy protests, have refused to wear school uniforms on the first day of term, in a defiant protest to demand individual freedom over their lives and their bodies. They used the hashtag #1ธันวาบอกลาเครื่องแบบ (#1DecemberDownwiththeuniform) on Twitter, and invited every students to wear casual clothes instead. This gained many attractions from both the media, and the government. After a while in that day, the students in many schools; such as Horwang (หอวัง), Bodindecha (บดินทรเดชา) who wore such clothes were punished by their own teachers, with some exception occurred in Samsen Wittayalai School — one of Thailand's most selective schools — which have responded positively to the protest. Students posted photos and stories of how the school staff and director have stood in front of the gates to welcome students in casual wear to freely enter and learn inside their classrooms.

Student communities began to question the necessity of the uniform, and seek the new solution towards their demand for reform of the country.

See also 
 School uniform
 Education in Thailand

References

External links 
  พระราชบัญญัติเครื่องแบบนักเรียน พุทธศักราช 2482 จากเว็บไซต์ราชกิจจานุเบกษา
 พระราชบัญญัติเครื่องแบบนักเรียน พ.ศ. 2551 จากเว็บไซต์ราชกิจจานุเบกษา
 ระเบียบกระทรวงธรรมการ ออกตามความในพระราชบัญญัติเครื่องแบบนักเรียน พุทธศักราช 2482 จากเว็บไซต์ราชกิจจานุเบกษา
 ระเบียบกระทรวงธรรมการ (ฉบับที่ 2) ออกตามความในพระราชบัญญัติเครื่องแบบนักเรียน พุทธศักราช 2482 จากเว็บไซต์ราชกิจจานุเบกษา
 ระเบียบกระทรวงธรรมการ (ฉบับที่ 3) ออกตามความในพระราชบัญญัติเครื่องแบบนักเรียน พุทธศักราช 2482 จากเว็บไซต์ราชกิจจานุเบกษา
 ระเบียบกระทรวงธรรมการ (ฉบับที่ 2) ออกตามความในพระราชบัญญัติเครื่องแบบนักเรียน พุทธศักราช 2482 (เพิ่มเติม ครั้งที่ 1) จากเว็บไซต์ราชกิจจานุเบกษา
 ระเบียบกระทรวงธรรมการ (ฉบับที่ 2) ออกตามความในพระราชบัญญัติเครื่องแบบนักเรียน พุทธศักราช 2482 (เพิ่มเติม ครั้งที่ 2) จากเว็บไซต์ราชกิจจานุเบกษา
 ระเบียบกระทรวงธรรมการ (ฉบับที่ 2) ออกตามความในพระราชบัญญัติเครื่องแบบนักเรียน พุทธศักราช 2482 (เพิ่มเติม ครั้งที่ 3) จากเว็บไซต์ราชกิจจานุเบกษา
 ระเบียบกระทรวงศึกษาธิการ (ฉบับที่ 3) ออกตามความในพระราชบัญญัติเครื่องแบบนักเรียน พุทธศักราช 2482 (แก้ไขเพิ่มเติม ครั้งที่ 1) จากเว็บไซต์ราชกิจจานุเบกษา
 ระเบียบกระทรวงศึกษาธิการ (ฉบับที่ 4) ออกตามความในพระราชบัญญัติเครื่องแบบนักเรียน พุทธศักราช 2482 จากเว็บไซต์ราชกิจจานุเบกษา
 ระเบียบกระทรวงศึกษาธิการ (ฉบับที่ 4) ออกตามความในพระราชบัญญัติเครื่องแบบนักเรียน พุทธศักราช 2482 (เพิ่มเติมในภาวะคับขัน ครั้งที่ 1) จากเว็บไซต์ราชกิจจานุเบกษา
 ระเบียบกระทรวงศึกษาธิการ (ฉบับที่ 4) ออกตามความในพระราชบัญญัติเครื่องแบบนักเรียน พุทธศักราช 2482 (เพิ่มเติมในภาวะคับขัน ครั้งที่ 2) จากเว็บไซต์ราชกิจจานุเบกษา
 ระเบียบกระทรวงศึกษาธิการ (ฉบับที่ 4) ออกตามความในพระราชบัญญัติเครื่องแบบนักเรียน พุทธศักราช 2482 (เพิ่มเติม ครั้งที่ 1) จากเว็บไซต์ราชกิจจานุเบกษา

Education in Thailand
School uniform